Itamus is a genus of beetles in the family Carabidae, containing the following species:

 Itamus castaneus Schmidt-Goebel, 1846
 Itamus cavicola (Moore, 1978)
 Itamus dentatus Andrewes, 1919
 Itamus kaszabi Jedlicka, 1968

References

Paussinae